Arthur Davison was an Australian professional rugby league footballer in the New South Wales Rugby League (NSWRL) Competition.

Davison played for Eastern Suburbs side in the 1914 season, the year the club won its first City Cup. He only made one appearance, playing his only career game in Easts' 2–9 loss to Balmain in round 14.

References

The Encyclopedia Of Rugby League; Alan Whiticker & Glen Hudson

Australian rugby league players
Sydney Roosters players
Year of death missing
Year of birth missing
Place of birth missing
Rugby league halfbacks